This is a list of films produced in Taiwan ordered by year of release. For an alphabetical list of Taiwanese films see :Category:Taiwanese films

2020

2021

References

External links
 Taiwanese film at the Internet Movie Database

2020s
2020s in Taiwan
Taiwan